Malanowski (feminine Malanowska) is a Polish surname, denoting a person from the village of Malanów. Notable people include:

 Feliks Malanowski, Polish athlete
 Thaddeus F. Malanowski, American Catholic priest

Polish-language surnames
Toponymic surnames